Milkweed, Asclepias, is a genus of herbaceous, perennial, flowering plants named for their milky latex sap.

Milkweed may also refer to:

Plants
 Euphorbia heterophylla, native to the Americas
 Euphorbia peplus, native to most of Europe, northern Africa, and western Asia

Other uses
 Milkweed (novel), a children's novel by Jerry Spinelli
 Milkweed Editions, an independent publishing company based in Minneapolis, Minnesota
 Monarch butterfly (Danaus plexippus), also known as the milkweed

See also
List of plants known as milk thistle